Louisville High School is a private, Catholic, college-preparatory school for girls in grades 9 through 12, located in Woodland Hills, CA at the western end of the San Fernando Valley. Louisville educates young women in a vibrant, supportive learning community guided by the mission of the Sisters of St. Louis to “work toward a world healed, unified, and transformed.” Challenging academics and caring faculty empower each student to develop her confidence, integrity, and faith to meet the needs of an ever-changing world.

History
The school was founded by the Sisters of Saint Louis, an order established in France during the 19th century by Abbé Louis Eugène Marie Bautain, though most of the current Sisters hail from Ireland. The convent of the Sisters of St. Louis lies on a hill overlooking the school. The school and convent are built on what was once the Manzanita Ranch, the former estate of Oscar-nominated actress Marjorie Rambeau. Manzanita refers to a small evergreen shrub that grows on the hills surrounding Louisville. Under the leadership of Sister Mary Ronan, Manzanita Ranch was purchased for renovation and construction. The first class of 9th grade students entered in September of 1960.Louisville pa with the all-boys' college preparatory school Crespi Carmelite High School in Encino.

References

External links
 

Girls' schools in California
Educational institutions established in 1960
Roman Catholic secondary schools in Los Angeles County, California
High schools in the San Fernando Valley
Woodland Hills, Los Angeles
1960 establishments in California
Catholic secondary schools in California